José Ney López Benalcázar (born 30 September 1929) was a Colombian weightlifter. He competed at the 1956 Summer Olympics and the 1960 Summer Olympics.

References

External links
 

1929 births
Living people
Colombian male weightlifters
Olympic weightlifters of Colombia
Weightlifters at the 1956 Summer Olympics
Weightlifters at the 1960 Summer Olympics
People from Palmira, Valle del Cauca
Sportspeople from Valle del Cauca Department
20th-century Colombian people
21st-century Colombian people